Prose Field  is a privately owned public airport in Justin, Denton County, Texas, United States, located approximately  south-southwest of the central business district. The airport has no IATA or ICAO designation.

The airport is used solely for general aviation purposes.

Facilities 
 Runway 18/36: 1,660 x 60 ft. (506 x 18 m), Surface: Turf

For the 12-month period ending December 31, 2015, the airport had 200 aircraft operations, an average of 17 per month: 100% general aviation. At that time there were 2 aircraft based at this airport: 100% single-engine, with no multi-engine, jets, helicopters, ultralights, or gliders.

References

External links 
  at Texas DOT Airport Directory

Airports in Texas
Airports in the Dallas–Fort Worth metroplex
Transportation in Denton County, Texas